The Annapurna Sanctuary is a high glacial basin lying 40 km directly north of Pokhara. This oval-shaped plateau sits at an altitude of over 4000 metres, and is surrounded by a ring of mountains, the Annapurna range, most of which are over 7000 metres.  With the only entrance a narrow valley between the peaks of Hiunchuli and Machapuchare, where run-off from glaciers drain into Modi Khola River, the Sanctuary was not penetrated by outsiders until 1956. Because of high mountains on all sides, the Annapurna Sanctuary receives only 7 hours of sunlight a day at the height of summer. The unique combination of heights and depths on the 5-7 day trek into the Annapurna Sanctuary give rise to an extraordinary variety of ecosystems.  The south-facing slopes are covered in dense tropical jungles of rhododendron and bamboo, while the north-facing slopes, in the rain shadow, have a drier colder climate similar to that of the near-by Tibetan Plateau.

The entire sanctuary was held as sacred to the Gurung people, one of the many native people to inhabit the area. They believed it was the repository of gold and various treasures left by the Nāgas, the serpent-gods known in India.  The sanctuary was believed to be the home of several deities, from Hinduism and Buddhism as well as older animistic gods. The peak of Machapuchare at the entrance was believed to be the home of the god Shiva, and the daily plumes of snow were thought the smoke of his divine incense.  Until recently, the local Gurung people forbade anyone from bringing eggs or meat into the Annapurna Sanctuary, and women and untouchables were prohibited from going there as well.

The Annapurna Sanctuary is now part of the Annapurna Conservation Area Project, which places restrictions on number of outside travelers, gathering of firewood, and domestic animal grazing.

References

External links

Hiking trails in Nepal